Joyce Anderson (April 10, 1932 – November 21, 2022) was a Canadian painter and art teacher.

Early life 
Anderson was born to Pieter and Sabina Besse (née Nieuwenburg) in Winnipeg, Manitoba on April 10, 1932. She began painting when she was 12 or 13. She never trained formally as a painter. Anderson began painting seriously in 1952.

Career 
Anderson became a high school art teacher in the 1970s. She taught at Tec Voc high school for 21 years, until 1994.

Anderson's paintings have been displayed at the Manitoba Legislature, the Winnipeg Police Museum, and the Winnipeg Art Gallery. Towards the end of her life, Anderson showcased her work and held auctions at the River Ridge Retirement Residence in Winnipeg. She also taught art classes there and at the Fort Rouge Community Club.

Personal life 
Anderson was pre-deceased by her husband of 44 years, police officer Bertil Anderson. They had two children. She died on November 21, 2022 at age 90 at Saint Boniface Hospital in Winnipeg.

References 

2022 deaths
Canadian art educators
21st-century Canadian painters
20th-century Canadian painters
20th-century Canadian women artists
21st-century Canadian women artists
Canadian women painters
Artists from Winnipeg
1932 births